Juan Direction was a weekly, 30 minute documentary-style reality show that aired on TV5 in the Philippines. It aired every Sunday from 10:15pm to 10:45pm.

The show's first season aired from June 23, 2014 to July 4, 2014. The third and final season aired from September 22, 2014 to October 3, 2014.

History

The original members of Juan Direction first formed the group in 2012 under the name "Island Media Asia" (IMA). They originally posted tutorial and documentary-style travel videos on Twitch.  Their style was described as "vlogumentary", a mix of vlogging and documentary.

Although they continued to make videos online after beginning the reality show, their main popularity was a result of the group's previous work on YouTube. While IMA had seven members and Juan Direction featured only five of the original members, the other two (Matthew Edwards and Keys Cosido) had a recurring role in the Juan Direction reality show.

Production
Juan Direction was one of the shows launched in TV5's "Everyday All the Way" trade launch in Taguig in October 2013, and in TV5 Happy Ka Dito in June 2014.

From June 23, 2014 – July 4, 2014, Juan Direction was shifted to weekday primetime as they aired a special two-week season entitled "Juan Experiment ng Juan Direction". In this show, the group participated in various tasks that would challenge their abilities to establish friendships and build relationships, with the end-goal of trying to prove that the differences between cultures no longer matter.

On September 22, 2014, Juan Direction returned on weekday primetime with a new season titled Juan Islanders.

Cast

Main cast
 Brian Wilson – Born in Berlin, Germany to a German mother and a French father. When he was two months old, his parents brought him to the Czech Republic.
 Daniel Marsh – Born in Argao, Cebu, half Irish and half Filipino
 Henry Edwards – half British and half Filipino. Born in Angeles, Pampanga.
 Michael McDonnell – Born in Dauis, Bohol to a Czechoslovakian-Canadian father and a Boholano mother
 Charlie Sutcliffe – half British and half Filipino

Recurring cast
 Matthew "Matt" Edwards - half British and half Filipino. Former contestant and winner of The Amazing Race Philippines Season 2.
 Keys Cosido - half British and half Filipino.

Episodes

Season 1

Season 2

References

TV5 (Philippine TV network) original programming
Philippine reality television series
2013 Philippine television series debuts
2014 Philippine television series endings
Filipino-language television shows